María Guadalupe Romero Castillo (born 3 October 1952) is a Mexican politician affiliated with the National Action Party. As of 2014 she served as Senator of the LVIII and LIX Legislatures of the Mexican Congress representing the Federal District and as Deputy of the LIII and LVI Legislatures.

References

1952 births
Living people
Politicians from Mexico City
Women members of the Senate of the Republic (Mexico)
Members of the Senate of the Republic (Mexico)
Members of the Chamber of Deputies (Mexico)
National Action Party (Mexico) politicians
20th-century Mexican politicians
20th-century Mexican women politicians
21st-century Mexican politicians
21st-century Mexican women politicians
Women members of the Chamber of Deputies (Mexico)